"Jackie's Strength" is a song by Tori Amos, released as the second single from her 1998 album From the Choirgirl Hotel. It reached #54 on the U.S. Hot 100 chart. The remix single, released the following year, reached number one on the Hot Dance Club Play chart in the U.S. The lyrics refer to Jackie Onassis, there is also a brief reference to the Kennedy assassination ("Shots rang out, the police came"), though Amos herself explained that the song also concerns her own personal doubts about marriage.  Amos reiterated this in an interview with columnist Steven Daly in Rolling Stone (Issue #789;  June 25, 1998).

Background
"Jackie's Strength" is really... I was asked to get married, right? And I was quite nervous because I never thought I'd get married before. It just wasn't something that I was gonna do. Even though I believe in monogamy, just having the church and state condone my union wasn't important to me. And in fact, I really didn't want that. So, when he asked me, it brought up, obviously, a lot of things. And I started going back in my little movie in my head, different moments of my life. And I remember my mother telling me that the day Kennedy died, John F. Kennedy, that she put me down, she had to lay me down because her heart started to slow down and she couldn't breathe. And um, all she thought of was Jackie and the strength that it would take Jackie to lead the nation.. which she did. And I really knew that I was gonna need some kind of strength because I'm made up of like two personalities. There's one side of me that could very easily have ended up at the 7-Eleven sitting outside drinking a Slurpee in my wedding dress and just missing the whole thing. And then there's the other one that did make it to the church. So, this song is about the one that drank the Slurpee. She's still out there somewhere.

Music video
The music video, which is in black and white, portrays Amos as a bride on her wedding day. She travels in a taxi cab, hiding from her wedding party as the taxi passes by the church where she is to be married.  The video includes imagery of realistic situations such as teen pregnancy, pre-marital sex, interracial relationships and use of medication by elderly persons. It was directed by James Brown.

Track listing

US Enhanced CD single
Includes videos of "Jackie's Strength" and "Raspberry Swirl"
 "Jackie's Strength" - 4:17
 "Never Seen Blue" - 3:41
 "Beulah Land" - 2:56

US CD remix single
 "Jackie's Strength (Wedding Cake Edit)" - 4:03
 "Father Lucifer (Sylkscreen Remix)" - 4:30
 "Jackie's Strength (Wedding Cake Club Mix)" - 8:40
 "Jackie's Strength (One Rascal Dub #1)" - 6:24
 "Father Lucifer (Sylkscreen Remix Instrumental)" - 4:26
 "Jackie's Strength (Wedding Cake Meltdown Mix)" - 8:19
 "Jackie's Strength (One Rascal Dub #2)" - 5:02
 "Jackie's Strength (Bonus Beats)" - 2:41

Charts

Year-end charts

Reception
More than 10,000 units of the single have been sold as of October 3, 1998. It also peaked at number 33 in Billboard Hot 100 Singles Sales.

References

See also
List of number-one dance hits (United States)

Tori Amos songs
1998 singles
1999 singles
Songs written by Tori Amos
1997 songs
Atlantic Records singles
Cultural depictions of Jacqueline Kennedy Onassis
Songs about marriage
Songs about socialites